Jacques Anne Joseph Le Prestre de Vauban (10 March 1754, in Dijon – 20 April 1816) was a French general of the Ancien Régime. He took part in the American War of Independence, and later in the Chouannerie uprising against the Republic during the French Revolutionary Wars. He was the grandson of Antoine Le Prestre de Vauban.

Biography 
Entering military service in 1770, he was Rochambeau's  aide-de-camp during the American War of Independence and was sent back to France with the general's dispatches in 1782.  He became colonel and second in command of the régiment d'Agenors, and shortly afterwards, the duc d'Orléans, whose chamberlain he was, made him colonel in command of the régiment d'infanterie that took his name and knight of the order of Saint-Louis on 13 June 1784.

Like most other officer of his corps, he emigrated around the time of Louis XVI's flight to Varennes, going to Ath, then Koblenz, where the comte d'Artois made him his aide-de-camp.  He accompanied him in this role during the campaign of 1792 and on his trip to Russia in 1793, where they were well received by Catherine II of Russia.  He then went to England, and in spring 1795 joined the Quiberon expedition.  Tasked by Joseph-Geneviève de Puisaye with commanding a unit of Chouans charged with attacking the rear of the Republican army, he was prevented by the forces of Hoche and, tricked by false signals, forced to retreat.  He fulfilled several different missions to the Vendée and the île d'Yeu, with the comte d'Artois. Returning to London, he hastened to return to Russia but arrived there at the moment of Catherine's death, fell victim (like most French Royalists in Russia) to Paul I's changeability and was soon forced to leave.  He returned to France and stayed for a time in Paris, with  police consent, until he was arrested in 1806 and held prisoner for a long while in the Temple.

Notes, citations, and references

Notes

Citations

References
"Jacques Anne Joseph Le Prestre de Vauban", in Louis-Gabriel Michaud, Biographie universelle ancienne et moderne : histoire par ordre alphabétique de la vie publique et privée de tous les hommes avec la collaboration de plus de 300 savants et littérateurs français ou étrangers, 2e édition, 1843–1865

1754 births
1816 deaths
Military personnel from Dijon
French military personnel of the American Revolutionary War
French generals
French counter-revolutionaries
Royalist insurgents during the French Revolution
Knights of the Order of Saint Louis